The Suffolk Sports Hall of Fame is an American sports hall of fame based in Suffolk County on Long Island, New York. The non-profit was established during 1990 to honor outstanding people, living or deceased, who have gained prominence and made substantial contributions on behalf of themselves and Suffolk County in professional and amateur sports.

History 
During its early existence, The Suffolk Sports Hall of Fame maintained a museum and education center that was located on South Ocean Avenue in Patchogue, New York. The facility closed during 2013. Soon after, traveling and permanent satellite exhibits began to appeare throughout Suffolk County. Permanent exhibits are featured at Long Island MacArthur Airport, Bethpage Ballpark, home of the Long Island Ducks, and Huntington Town Hall.

Since 1990, 396 inductees have entered the Suffolk Sports Hall of Fame.

The Hall of Fame underwent a significant transformation during 2017-2018 under the guidance of Executive Director Chris R. Vaccaro. He implemented a rebranding initiative for the organization that included new logo, the development of a website and the creation of social media channels. Vaccaro also addressed portions of the annual induction ceremony and golf outing that provided greater recognition for the organization among supporters, inductees and the public.

In August 2019, the Suffolk Sports Hall of Fame debuted its historic marker program that honors locations of sporting significance within the county.  The first marker commemorated Bethpage Ballpark, the home of the Long Island Ducks. This location is the site of the longest operated professional sports franchise and ballpark in Suffolk County history.

Executive directors 
 Gaetano “Butch” Dellecave, 1990-2000
 Edward J. Morris, 2000-2017
 Chris R. Vaccaro, 2017–Present

Categories of induction

The Suffolk Sports Hall of Fame honors inductees in 33 categories.

 Athletic Directors 
 Auto Racing 
 Badminton 
 Baseball 
 Basketball 
 Boating & Nautical 
 Bowling 
 Boxing 
 Coaches 
 Community Sports 
 Field Hockey 
 Football 
 Golf 
 Gymnastics 
 Handball 
 Hockey 
 HOF Committee Member / Founder 
 Horse Racing 
 Journalism & Media 
 Lacrosse 
 Martial Arts 
 Officials 
 Olympics 
 Professional Sports
 Soccer 
 Softball 
 Special Olympics 
 Sports Medicine 
 Swimming & Diving 
 Tennis 
 Track & Field 
 Volleyball 
 Wrestling

Special categories
Historic Recognition for individuals and teams. Inductees: New York Cuban Giants, Belmont Family, Harry Chadwick (writer), Marion Hollins and John Montgomery Ward, and Charlie Bunger.
Special Recognition for individuals and athletic programs. Inductees: Louis J. Acompora, Dr. H. Jean Berger, Matthew DiStefano, Aaron Feis, Ruth Gracey, Annamae McKeever-Kress, Jeannette Rogers, Ward Melville Boys Lacrosse and Ralph Macchio.
Edward J. Morris Lifetime Achievement Award: named for the 2000-2017 executive director of the Suffolk Sports Hall of Fame, the award honors an individual who has committed a lifetime to generate a positive impact in Suffolk County Sports.The first recipient was Edward J. Morris.
Golf Tournament Honorees: each year, The Suffolk Sports Hall of Fame honors an individual at the annual golf outing.
Special Recognition Award: presented to an organization or group that supports a community through sports and athletics.

Inductees
Suffolk Sports Hall of Fame inductees appear below.

References

External links 

 Suffolk Sports Hall of Fame Official Website
 Suffolk Sports Hall of Fame Facebook
 Suffolk Sports Hall of Fame Twitter
 Suffolk Sports Hall of Fame Instagram
 Suffolk Sports Hall of Fame YouTube

1990 establishments in New York (state)
Sports halls of fame
Long Island